Frederick William Pethick-Lawrence, 1st Baron Pethick-Lawrence, PC (né Lawrence; 28 December 1871 – 10 September 1961) was a British Labour politician who, among other things, campaigned for women's suffrage.

Background and education
Born in London as Frederick William Lawrence, he was the son of wealthy Unitarians who were members of the Liberal Party. Three of his father's brothers, William, James, and Edwin, were politically active in various roles, including as Lord Mayor of London and as members of parliament. Frederick was educated at Wixenford, Eton, and Trinity College, Cambridge, where he was a member of Cambridge University Liberal Club. He then became a barrister.

Political career

Lawrence met and fell in love with Emmeline Pethick, an active socialist and campaigner for women's votes. They finally married in 1901 after Lawrence converted to socialism. They kept separate bank accounts and they both took the surname 'Pethick Lawrence' (later Pethick-Lawrence). He published various left-wing newspapers, including Votes for Women and became involved in the Labour Party. His involvement in the Women's Social and Political Union (WSPU), on behalf of women's rights, led to him serving a nine-month prison sentence in 1912, following Christabel Pankhurst's window-smashing campaign, even though he had disagreed with that form of action; because of his disagreement, indeed, he was expelled from the WSPU by Emmeline Pankhurst and Christabel. On account of his prison sentence he was expelled from the Reform Club.
Early in the First World War Pethick-Lawrence joined with others in founding the Union of Democratic Control (UDC), a leading anti-war organisation of which he became Treasurer. After acceptance by a Tribunal in Dorking in 1918, he worked on a farm in Sussex as a conscientious objector.

In 1923 Pethick-Lawrence was elected Member of Parliament (MP) for Leicester West, and was Financial Secretary to the Treasury from 1929 until the formation of the National Government in 1931; in the ensuing General Election and the rout of the Labour Party he lost his seat. He was elected for Edinburgh East in 1935 and sworn of the Privy Council in 1937. From 1942 he acted as Leader of the Opposition to the coalition government. In 1945 Pethick-Lawrence was elevated to the peerage as Baron Pethick-Lawrence, of Peaslake in the County of Surrey. From 1945 to 1947 he was Secretary of State for India and Burma, with a seat in the cabinet, and was involved in the negotiations that led to India's independence in 1947. Prime Minister Clement Attlee, however, made all the government's major decisions regarding India.

Personal life
His first wife, Emmeline, Lady Pethick-Lawrence, died in 1954. Lord Pethwick-Lawrence later married Helen Craggs. He died at Hendon, London, in September 1961, aged 89.

His older sister Annie Jane Lawrence (1863-1953) was responsible for building the open-air Arts and Crafts school The Cloisters in Letchworth Garden City.

Posthumous recognition
His name and picture (and those of 58 other women's suffrage supporters) are on the plinth of the statue of Millicent Fawcett in Parliament Square, London, unveiled in 2018.

References

External links
 
 
 spartacus-educational.com

1871 births
1961 deaths
British Secretaries of State
British conscientious objectors
British politicians convicted of crimes
Foreign Office personnel of World War II
Labour Party (UK) MPs for English constituencies
Labour Party (UK) hereditary peers
Members of the Fabian Society
Members of the Parliament of the United Kingdom for Edinburgh constituencies
Members of the Privy Council of the United Kingdom
Ministers in the Attlee governments, 1945–1951
People educated at Eton College
People educated at Wixenford School
Presidents of the Cambridge Union
Scottish Labour MPs
UK MPs 1923–1924
UK MPs 1924–1929
UK MPs 1929–1931
UK MPs 1935–1945
UK MPs who were granted peerages
Barons created by George VI